Tapiscia is a genus of flowering plants in the family Tapisciaceae. Some authors recognize only one species, Tapiscia sinensis. Other authors recognize two species, T. sinensis and T. yunnanensis.

References

Tapisciaceae
Rosid genera
Taxonomy articles created by Polbot
Taxa named by Daniel Oliver